MacIP refers to a standard for encapsulating Internet Protocol (IP) packets within the AppleTalk DDP protocol. This allows Macintosh computers with LocalTalk networking hardware to access the normally Ethernet-based connections for TCP/IP based network services. This was an important bridging technology during the era when Ethernet and TCP/IP were rapidly growing in popularity in the early 1990s.

Software implementing MacIP, such as MacTCP or Open Transport, was installed on the computer and a MacIP Gateway was placed elsewhere on the network. Applications that communicate with TCP/IP (such as Telnet) have their IP packets encapsulated in DDP for transmission across the LocalTalk network to the MacIP Gateway. The MacIP Gateway strips off the DDP encapsulation and forwards the IP packet on the IP network.

The gateways were often implemented as part of a LocalTalk-to-Ethernet bridge device, small hardware systems primarily designed to allow communications between LocalTalk and EtherTalk equipped AppleTalk machines (like the Mac II and a LaserWriter). MacIP routing was often implemented as an optional adjunct to the AppleTalk routing. Cisco Systems supported AppleTalk in their proprietary IOS (up to and including version 12.4(15)T14, on select platforms) which in turn could provide MacIP-Services.

History
The practice of encapsulating IP packets within DDP was originally developed at Stanford University as the Stanford Ethernet - AppleTalk Gateway (SEAGATE) by Bill Croft in 1984 and 1985.

The SEAGATE hardware was commercialized by Kinetics in 1985. The Kinetics Internet Protocol (KIP) was used to integrate with their FastPath LocalTalk-to-Ethernet bridge. Apple Computer embraced the use of the encapsulation technology, which came to be known as MacIP.

One of the mandates for the Internet Engineering Task Force (IETF) "IP over AppleTalk" working group was to document existing MacIP implementations and to develop a specification for MacIP that could be proposed as a standard. A draft document was submitted, however it was not accepted as a standard and has subsequently expired.

Apple subsequently developed a new protocol AppleShare IP which is not backwardly compatible.

See also 
 Kinetics FastPath
GatorBox
 LocalTalk-to-Ethernet bridge

References

External links 
MacIP Internet Draft
TCP/IP Packets: How AppleTalk Encapsulation Works
Page describing software required to connect vintage Apple computers to networks
Network World article "Apple IP Gateway spurs ANF on MacIP standard"
Page describing how to use Cisco routers as MacIP gateways English translation

Macintosh operating systems APIs
Internet protocols
Network layer protocols